The Ambrosini SAI.207 was a light fighter interceptor built entirely from wood and developed in Italy during World War II. Powered by a single 750 hp Isotta Fraschini Delta, the SAI.207 enjoyed limited success during evaluation of the 12 pre-production aircraft.

Development
The SAI.207 was developed from the Ambrosini SAI.7 racing and sporting monoplane after the light fighter concept had been proven with the Ambrosini SAI.207 prototype. Stefanutti designed the aircraft to have a lightweight structure and light armament to allow lower-powered engines to be used, without unduly reducing performance.

The first of three prototypes was completed and flown in the Autumn of 1940. The SAI.107 was lost, along with pilot Arturo Ferrarin, in a crash on 18 July 1941.

Two more fighter prototypes were built as SAI.207s, flying for the first time in the spring of 1941 and 1942.

Design

The SAI.207 was a single-seat, low-wing monoplane with a conventional tail-wheel undercarriage, developed from the Ambrosini SAI.7. Its lightweight wooden construction, combined with a  Isotta Fraschini Delta R.C.40 inverted-V engine, with a center-line cooling air intake, provided speed and agility. Armament consisted of two fuselage-mounted  Breda-SAFAT machine guns.

In level-flight the performance of the SAI.207 was impressive. The Ministero dell'Aeronautica soon placed a production order for 2,000 machines, plus a pre-production batch of 12 aircraft for operational testing. After the mixed results of operational evaluation and the signing of the Armistice, no production aircraft were built.

Operational history

Flight testing revealed some major shortcomings, most of which were not rectified before the Armistice in 1943; the low power and high wing loading resulted in poor climb performance; the light structure prevented more powerful cannon from being used as the recoil forces overstressed the mounting structure; the rear cylinders of the engine overheated during recovery from a dive; the light structure also led to problems, with the second prototype wing exploding during a dive recovery due to internal pressure built up, caused by the lack of internal fairings in the undercarriage bays. The wooden structure was also badly affected by rain or humidity.

The pre-production batch of 12 aircraft served briefly with three squadrons. The first was 83rd Squadriglia, 18 Gruppo, 3 Stormo, led by Guglielmo Specker, one of the Regia Aeronauticas best known "aces", at Cerveteri airfield, near Rome. The aircraft entered service in July 1943, flying a number of combat missions against heavy Allied raids over the Italian capital, but without success. After one month, they were sent to Castiglione del Lago G.Eleuteri airfield (at that time one of the main RA training airbases), where it was planned that 161 and 162nd Squadriglia would take the aircraft into service.

Despite its speed, Italian pilots were not impressed by the type and its service in the summer of 1943 quickly ended. The aircraft of 83rd Squadriglia were returned to SAI-Ambrosini to be refurbished, but the Armistice made it impossible for them to return to their squadron.

Operators

Regia Aeronautica

Specifications (SAI.207)

See also

References

Notes

Bibliography

 Angelucci, Enzo and Paolo Matricardi. World Aircraft: World War II, Volume II (Sampson Low Guides). Maidenhead, UK: Sampson Low, 1978. .
 Cattaneo, Gianni. SAI-Ambrosini 207 e derivati (in Italian & English). Roma, Italy: La Bancarella Aeronautica, 2005.
 Emiliani, Angelo. "Il Volo e la Scaramanzia" (in Italian). Storia Militare magazine No.77, February 2000.
 Green, William. Warplanes of the Second World War, Volume Two: Fighters. London: Macdonald & Co. (Publishers) Ltd., 1961.
 Lembo, Daniele I caccia SAI-Ambrosini (in Italian). Aerei nella Storia magazine No.39, December 2003.
 Taylor, Michael J. H. Jane's Encyclopedia of Aviation. London: Studio Editions, 1989.

SAI Ambrosini aircraft
1940s Italian fighter aircraft

Single-engined tractor aircraft
Low-wing aircraft
Aircraft first flown in 1941